Daniel Lentz (born March 10, 1942, Latrobe, Pennsylvania, United States) is an American classical electronic music composer  and artist who specializes in sculptured acrylic illuminated manuscripts.

Biography
Lentz achieved notability as a musician while a student at St. Vincent College and at Brandeis University, when he was awarded a fellowship in composition at Tanglewood in the summer of 1966. This was followed by a Fulbright Fellowship in Electronic Music in 1967–68, which was completed in Stockholm, Sweden. He then became a visiting lecturer at the University of California, Santa Barbara in 1968. In 1970 he focused more on composing and performing. At this time he also formed a music ensemble, the California Time Machine, which toured North America and Europe.

In 1972, Lentz was the first American to win the Gaudeamus International Composers Award. Since then, he has won a number of other awards and grants. Lentz then formed and led another music ensemble, the San Andreas Fault, which made several tours of the North America and Europe performing Missa Umbrarum (Mass of Shadows) (1973) amongst other works, and released several recordings in Europe. Returning to California, Lentz formed the Daniel Lentz Group in Los Angeles. This ensemble has toured much of the world and has released a number of recordings. His 1987 album The Crack in the Bell was the first contemporary classical release from Angel/EMI Records.

As an artist Lentz creates acrylic sculptures notably his Illuminated Manuscript series., which are 3 dimensional realisations (i.e. the score) of a recorded musical work by Lentz that accompanies each.

Lentz has a daughter from his first marriage and now lives in Southern California.

Grants, Fellowships, Awards
Rockefeller Foundation, Bellagio Center, Italy, Music Composition, 2012
Opus Archives, Pacifica Institute, Music Composition, 2010
Phoenix Arts Commission Grant, Music Composition, 2000
2 Arizona Commission In The Arts Grants, Music Composition, 1992, 1997
3 Institute For Studies In The Arts Grants, Arizona State University, Music Composition, 1993, 1995, 1996
5 National Endowment For The Arts Grants, Music Composition, 1973–96
D.A.A.D Grant, Music Composition And Research, Berlin, Germany, 1979–80
3 Seed Fund Grants, New York, Music Composition, 1976, 1978, 1980
California Arts Council Grant, Music Composition, 1976
Howard Foundation Grant, Brown University, Music Composition, 1974
First Prize, International Composers Competition, Stichting Gaudeamus, Holland, 1972
Creative Arts Institute Award, University Of California, Berkeley, 1969
Fulbright Fellowship, Sweden, Electronic Music And Musicology, 1967–68
Samuel Wechsler Music Award, Brandeis University, 1967
Tanglewood Composition Fellowship, 1966
N.D.E.A. Fellowship-Scholarship, Brandeis University, 1965–67
Teaching Fellowship, Ohio University, 1962–65

Discography 
 In a Word (with Ian William Craig) (2022, FRKWYS/RVNG International)
 Voices (Aoede Records)
 Wild Turkeys (Aoede Records)
 wolfMASS (Aoede Records)
 Point Conception (Cold Blue Music), (Aoede Records)
 Huit ou Neuf Pieces Dorées à Point (Aoede Records)
 Collection (Aoede Records)
 Self Portrait (Aoede Records)
 Butterfly Blood (Aoede Records)
 Missa Umbrarum (New Albion Records)
 Portraits (New Albion Records) – with John Adams, Paul Dresher, Ingram Marshall, and Stephen Scott
 Apologetica (New Albion Records)
 b.e.comings (Fontec/Rhizome Sketch Records)
 Walk into My Voice (Materiali Sonori) – with Harold Budd and Jessica Karraker
 Music for 3 Pianos (Virgin/EMI Records) – with Harold Budd and Ruben Garcia
 The Crack in the Bell (1987, Angel/EMI Records)
 On The Leopard Altar (1984; reissued 2006 by Cold Blue Music) (Icon Records)
 After Images (Cold Blue Music)
 Spell (ABC Command Records)
 Dancing on Water (Cold Blue Music) – contains Song(s) of the Sirens, with Peter Garland, Michael Byron, Rick Cox, Jim Fox and others,
 Cold Blue anthology (Cold Blue Music) – contains You Can't See the Forest ... Music, with Ingram Marshall, Chas Smith, Harold Budd, Michael Byron, Jim Fox, and others (Cold Blue Music)
 Los Tigres de Marte (Cold Blue Music)

References

External links 
 
 
 Aeode Records (Lentz’s label)
 New Albion Records
 Cold Blue Music
 Lentz interview by The Mouth Magazine, 2014

1942 births
Living people
People from Latrobe, Pennsylvania
20th-century classical composers
21st-century classical composers
American male classical composers
American classical composers
Angel Records artists
American electronic musicians
Musicians from Pittsburgh
Musicians from Albuquerque, New Mexico
Gaudeamus Composition Competition prize-winners
21st-century American composers
20th-century American composers
Classical musicians from Pennsylvania
20th-century American male musicians
21st-century American male musicians